Church of Christ is a Lutheran church in Riga, the capital of Latvia. It is a parish church of the Evangelical Lutheran Church of Latvia, under the episcopal authority of the Archbishop of Riga. The location where the church meets is situated at the address 1 Mēness Street.

References

External links
 Church website (in Latvian)

Churches in Riga
Lutheran churches in Latvia